Gob an Choire or Gob a' Choire (English name: Achill Sound), formerly anglicised as Gubacurra, is a Gaeltacht village in County Mayo, Ireland. It lies on the east coast of Achill Island and is the first settlement one reaches after crossing the Michael Davitt Bridge, a swing bridge that joins Achill Island to Corraun Peninsula on the mainland. In ancient times the southern entrance was guarded by Carrickkildavnet Castle.

Achill Sound is also the name of the waterway separating Achill Island from the Irish mainland.

Transport
Achill Sound is located on the R319 regional road.

Bus Éireann route 450 (Dooagh-Westport-Louisburgh) operates several times a day in each direction, less often on Sundays.

References

Villages in Achill Island
Towns and villages in County Mayo
Gaeltacht places in County Mayo
Gaeltacht towns and villages